Nelson Pedetti (born February 7, 1954, in Montevideo, Uruguay) is a former Uruguayan footballer who played for clubs of Chile (Cobreloa, Cobresal and Deportes Iquique).

Teams 
 Racing Club de Montevideo 1974-1975
 Club Nacional de Football 1976
  Cobreloa 1977-1980
  Deportes Iquique 1981-1982
  Cobresal 1983-1987

Titles
  Cobreloa 1980 (Chilean Championship)

External links
 

1954 births
Living people
Uruguayan footballers
Uruguayan expatriate footballers
Deportes Iquique footballers
Cobreloa footballers
Cobresal footballers
Expatriate footballers in Chile
Association football forwards